Yegor Parkhomenko (born 7 January 2003) is a Belarusian professional footballer who plays for Neman Grodno.

References

External links 
 
 

2003 births
Living people
Belarusian footballers
Association football defenders
FC Neman Grodno players
FC Lida players